James Loxton is a Rugby union player. His favored position is wing. Although born in Berlin in Germany, Loxton has been capped at U-19 and U-20 level for Wales. He is eligible to play for Ireland as he has an Irish Mother.

References

Rugby union wings
Connacht Rugby players
Welsh rugby union players
Living people
1990 births
German emigrants to Wales